Maybe It's Love is a 1935 American comedy film directed by William C. McGann and written by Jerry Wald and Harry Sauber. The film stars Gloria Stuart, Ross Alexander, Frank McHugh, Ruth Donnelly, Helen Lowell and Henry Travers. The film was released by Warner Bros. on January 12, 1935.

Maxwell Anderson's play was the basis for several movies including Saturday's Children, a 1929 film starring Corinne Griffith and Grant Withers. In 1940, Warner Bros. remade Saturday's Children.

Plot
Bobby and Rims are co-workers in a company owned by Adolph Mengle Sr. But their path to romance has two big impediments: she is the sole support of her lazy family—who would rather stay in their apartment and complain about sports and "the European situation"—and the boss' spoiled son, who is trying to break them up so he can marry her himself.

Cast        
 Gloria Stuart as Bobby Halevy
 Ross Alexander as Rims O'Neil
 Frank McHugh as Willie Sands
 Ruth Donnelly as Florrie Sands
 Helen Lowell as Mrs. Halevy
 Henry Travers as Mr. Halevy
 Joseph Cawthorn as Adolph Sr.
 Phillip Reed as Adolph Jr.
 Dorothy Dare as Lila
 J. Farrell MacDonald as The Cop
 Maude Eburne as Landlady

References

External links 
 
 
 
 

1935 films
1930s English-language films
Warner Bros. films
American comedy films
1935 comedy films
Films directed by William C. McGann
American black-and-white films
1930s American films